General William Sankey  (died 16 November 1892) was a British Army officer who served as colonel of the King's Own Royal Regiment (Lancaster).

Military career
Sankey was commissioned as an ensign in the British Army in 1844. He saw action as Deputy Assistant Quartermaster General and then as Assistant Quartermaster General at the Battle of Alma in September 1854, the Battle of Balaclava in October 1854 and the Siege of Sevastopol in Winter 1854 during the Crimean War. He was made Colonel of the 9th Regiment of Foot in 1862.

He became General Officer Commanding the Sialkot District in India in May 1873 and General Officer Commanding the Presidency District in January 1874. Made a General in 1881, he served as colonel of the King's Own (Royal Lancaster Regiment) (1890–92).

He died in Biarritz in 1892, aged 70.

References

1822 births
1892 deaths
British Army generals
Companions of the Order of the Bath